A leadership election was held by the Progressive Conservative Party of Ontario on April 27, 1949 to replace retiring  leader and premier George Drew who had resigned after losing his seat in the 1948 provincial election and deciding to enter federal politics. The interim leader of the party (and interim premier) was Thomas Laird Kennedy.  The party selected Leslie Frost on the first ballot.

FROST, Leslie 842
BLACKWELL, Leslie 442
ROBERTS, Kelso 121
PORTER, Dana 65

See also
Progressive Conservative Party of Ontario leadership conventions

References

1949
Progressive Conservative Party of Ontario leadership election
Progressive Conservative Party of Ontario leadership election
Progressive Conservative Party of Ontario leadership election